Sabz Ali Khan (also Romanized as Sabz ‘Alī Khān; also known as Dah Sabz Ali Khan and Deh Sabz Ali Khān) is a village in Sanjabi Rural District, Kuzaran District, Kermanshah County, Kermanshah Province, Iran. At the 2006 census, its population was 137, in 29 families.

References 

Populated places in Kermanshah County